Jaime López Sánchez (born 13 February 1986 in Telde, Las Palmas) is a Spanish modern pentathlete. Lopez competed for the men's event, at the 2008 Summer Olympics in Beijing. During the competition, Lopez made a strong start in the early segments, until he fell off by his horse Gege and did not finish the run in the riding segment. Following his disastrous horse fall and discontinuous riding leg, he finished abruptly in last place, with a score of 4,196 points.

References

External links
 
 NBC Olympics Profile

1986 births
Living people
Spanish male modern pentathletes
Olympic modern pentathletes of Spain
Modern pentathletes at the 2008 Summer Olympics
Sportspeople from Las Palmas
21st-century Spanish people